Simon Sydenham (died 1438) was a medieval Dean of Salisbury and Bishop of Chichester.

Sydenham was briefly Archdeacon of Berkshire in 1404, then Archdeacon of Salisbury from 1404 to 1418 and Dean of Salisbury from 1418 to 1431. Between 1417 and 1421 he was rector of Sutton Veny, Wiltshire. He was elected Bishop of Salisbury in 1426 but not consecrated, as his election was quashed the following year.

Sydenham was nominated to the office of Bishop of Chichester on 14 October 1429 and consecrated on 11 February 1431. He died on 26 January 1438.

Citations

References
 

1438 deaths
Archdeacons of Berkshire
Archdeacons of Salisbury
Deans of Salisbury
Bishops of Chichester
15th-century English Roman Catholic bishops
Year of birth unknown